Alessi is an Italian surname, derived from the given name Alessio (Alexis). Notable people with the surname include:

Andrea Alessi (1425–1505), Venetian Dalmatian architect and sculptor
Daniel Alessi (born 1997), Australian football (soccer) player
Dario Alessi (born 1967) British biochemist 
Diego Alessi (born 1973), Italian race car driver
Galeazzo Alessi (1512-1572), Italian architect
Giuseppe Alessi (1905-2009), President of the Regional Government of Sicily from 1947-1949 and again from 1955-1956
Giuseppe Alessi (soccer player) (born 1977), Italian footballer
James G. Alessi, American physicist
Joseph Alessi (born 1957), American trombonist
Marc Alessi (born 1976), American politician
Mark Alessi (1953-2019), American businessman and comic publisher
Mary Alessi (born 1968), American Christian songwriter
Mike Alessi (born 1988), American motorcycle racer
Ottavio Alessi (born 1919), Italian screenwriter, producer and film director
Ralph Alessi (born 1963), American jazz trumpeter and composer
Raquel Alessi (born 1983), American actress

Fictional characters:
Benito Alessi and his family, a fictional family on the Australian television series Neighbours

See also
Andrija Aleši, Albanian sculptor

Italian-language surnames
Patronymic surnames